Ismaël Boura (born 14 August 2000) is a French professional footballer who plays as a defender for Lens.

Career
Having been raised in the RC Lens youth system, Boura made his professional debut on 23 August 2020, for the Pas-de-Calaisiens first game back in the Ligue 1, starting the match against OGC Nice.

He was loaned to French Ligue 2 club Le Havre in 2021.

Personal life
Boura is of Comorian and Malagasy descent.

References

External links

2000 births
Living people
French footballers
French sportspeople of Comorian descent
French sportspeople of Malagasy descent
Association football defenders
RC Lens players
Le Havre AC players
Ligue 1 players
Ligue 2 players
Championnat National 2 players
Black French sportspeople